This article contains information about the literary events and publications of 1737.

Events
March 2 – Samuel Johnson and his former pupil David Garrick leave Lichfield to seek their fortunes in London.
June 21 – The Theatrical Licensing Act is passed, introducing censorship to the London stage. Plays now require approval before production. Edward Capell is appointed deputy-inspector of plays. "Legitimate drama" is limited to the theaters at Drury Lane, Covent Garden, and the Haymarket. The anonymous satire The Golden Rump (which may never have existed in full) is used as ammunition by the Act's proponents.
September 1 – The News Letter is first published in Belfast by Francis Joy, making it the world's oldest existing English newspaper.
October – The first professional stage production in the Swedish language by native-born actors is given in Sweden, of the comedy Den Svenska Sprätthöken at the Bollhuset in Stockholm.
November 20 – Caroline of Ansbach, Queen Consort of Great Britain and a significant patron of the arts, dies.
unknown date – The poet Richard Jago becomes curate of Snitterfield.

New books

Prose
Guillaume-Hyacinthe Bougeant – Amusement philosophique sur le language des bêtes (Philosophical Amusements on the Language of the Animals)
Alexander Cruden – A Complete Concordance to the Holy Scriptures of the Old and New Testament
Philip Doddridge – Submission to Divine Providence in the Death of Children
Stephen Duck – The Vision
Jonathan Edwards – A Faithful Narrative of the Surprising Works of God
Étienne Fourmont – Meditationes Sinicae
William Law – A Demonstration of the Gross and Fundamental Errors of a Late Book (an answer to Benjamin Hoadly from 1735)
Marguerite de Lubert – Tecserion
William Oldys – The British Librarian
Elizabeth Singer Rowe – Devout Exercises of the Heart
Sarah Stone – A Complete Practice of Midwifery
Jan Swammerdam – Biblia Naturae
Jonathan Swift – A Proposal for Giving Badges to the Beggars in all the Parishes of Dublin
Diego de Torres Villarroel – Médico para el bolsillo

Drama
Henry Carey – The Dragon of Wantley (burlesque opera adaptation)
Robert Dodsley – The King and the Miller of Mansfield
Henry Fielding
The Historical Register for the Year 1736
Eurydice Hiss'd, or a Word to the Wise
Robert Gould (died 1709) – Innocence Distress'd (published; written c. 1689 but never performed)
William Havard – King Charles I
 John Hewitt – A Tutor for the Beaus
 Samuel Johnson – All Alive and Merry
George Lillo – Fatal Curiosity
Francis Lynch – The Independent Patriot
Pierre de Marivaux – Les Fausses Confidences
James Miller – The Universal Passion (adapted from Much Ado About Nothing)

Poetry

Richard Glover – Leonidas
Matthew Green – The Spleen
Ignacio de Luzán – Poética
Alexander Pope
Horace His Ode to Venus
The Second Epistle of the Second Book of Horace, Imitated
The First Epistle of the Second Book of Horace, Imitated
The Works of Alexander Pope vols. v-vi
William Shenstone – Poems
Prince Thammathibet – The Legend of Phra Malai (พระมาลัยคำหลวง, Phra Malai)
Voltaire – Défense du Mondain ou l'apologie du luxe ("Defense of the Worldling or an Apology for Luxury"), a poetic response to criticism of his Le Mondain
John Wesley – A Collection of Psalms and Hymns

Births
January 19 – Jacques-Henri Bernardin de Saint-Pierre, French novelist and travel writer (died 1814)
January 29 – Thomas Paine, English free thinker and revolutionary (died 1809)
February 22 – Anne Ford, English writer, singer and musician (died 1824)
April 18 – William Hazlitt Sr., Irish religious writer, radical and Unitarian minister (died 1820)
April 27 – Edward Gibbon, English historian (died 1794)
May 11 (baptised) – Richard Chandler, English antiquary (died 1810)
unknown dates
Frances Abington, née Barton, English actress (died 1815)
Nicolas Fernández de Moratín, Spanish literary reformer (died 1780)

Deaths
February 21 – Elizabeth Rowe, English dramatist and poet (born 1674)
May – Jean Alphonse Turretin, Swiss theologian (born 1671)
May 4 – Eustace Budgell, English satirist (suicide, born 1686)
May 17 – Claude Buffier, philosopher and historian (born 1661)
June 21 – Matthieu Marais, French memoirist (born 1664)
August 28 – John Hutchinson, theologian (born 1674)
September 18 – Jane Fearon, English Quaker pamphleteer (born 1654 or 1656)
October 18 – Abel Evans, English poet (born 1679)
unknown dates – Matthew Green, English poet (born 1696)

References

 
 
Years of the 18th century in literature